Brum may refer to:
 Birmingham, England
 Brummagem, a colloquial name for Birmingham, England or the Birmingham dialect
 Brummie, inhabitants of Birmingham or the Birmingham dialect
 University of Birmingham
 Brum (TV series)
 Brum (surname), a Portuguese surname